Frida Eldebrink (born 4 January 1988) is a Swedish basketball player who last played for the San Antonio Stars of the Women's National Basketball Association (WNBA).

Her twin sister Elin is also a basketball player.  They are daughters of Kenth Eldebrink, javelin thrower and olympic medallist in 1984, while their uncle Anders Eldebrink is a former professional ice hockey player.

References

1988 births
Living people
Beşiktaş women's basketball players
San Antonio Stars players
Swedish expatriate basketball people in the United States
Swedish women's basketball players
Swedish expatriate basketball people in Spain
Swedish expatriate sportspeople in Turkey
Tarbes Gespe Bigorre players
Guards (basketball)
Swedish twins
People from Södertälje
Sportspeople from Stockholm County